Pusto Polje is a small village on the right bank of the Dreta River in the Municipality of Nazarje in Slovenia. The area is part of the traditional region of Styria and is now included in the Savinja Statistical Region.

References

External links
Pusto Polje on Geopedia

Populated places in the Municipality of Nazarje